From 1956 to 1978, USAC Championship Car seasons featured the top teams and drivers in  U.S. open-wheel racing.  Until 1971, the Championship contained road courses, ovals, dirt courses, and, on occasion, a hill climb.  Thereafter, the schedule consisted mainly of paved ovals.  In 1979, the majority of car owners left USAC to race in the Indy Car World Series, sanctioned by the Sports Car Club of America and CART.  This led to a decline in the number of events in the schedule, and by the 1984–85 season, the Championship comprised only one race, the Indianapolis 500.  The era of USAC Championship Cars concluded with the formation of the Indy Racing League (IRL) in 1995, which was sanctioned by USAC until June 1997 when the IRL assumed officiating duties after the controversial finish of the 81st Indianapolis 500 and the scoring mistake that marred the following event.  The most successful driver in USAC Championship Car history was A. J. Foyt with seven National Championships and four Indianapolis 500 victories.  Foyt competed in every season from 1957 to 1992–93.


Seasons

* The 1981-82 season included both the 65th and 66th Indianapolis 500 races.
( ) Figures in parentheses denote the number of non-championship races in that season.

References

See also

List of American Championship Car winners
List of American Championship Car Rookie of the Year Winners
Indianapolis 500 Rookie of the Year
List of Indianapolis 500 winners

 

 
 
American Championship Car winners